Bharath Shetty Y is an Indian dentist and politician. Shetty serves on the Karnataka Legislative Assembly, representing the Mangalore City North constituency. Shetty is a member of the BJP.

References 

Karnataka MLAs 2018–2023
1971 births
Bharatiya Janata Party politicians from Karnataka
Indian women medical doctors
21st-century women physicians
Politicians from Mangalore
Living people